Matthew Collins is an activist and author born in London in 1972. He was a member of several British fascist and neo-nazi organizations, before starting to work as an informant for an anti-fascist magazine. He later became an activist for anti-fascist and anti-racist campaigns.

Far Right politics and role as informant 
In his youth, Collins was the South London organizer for the National Front, a volunteer for the British National Party’s head office and a member of the neo-Nazi organization Combat 18.

Collins took part in the Battle of Welling after which he became a mole for the anti-fascist Searchlight magazine. Collins was paid in book tokens for his role as an informant. When his role as a Searchlight informant was exposed, Collins went into hiding in Australia from 1993 to 2003 with the assistance of Special Branch.

He returned to the UK as the subject of a BBC documentary Dead Man Walking (2004).

In 2012, Collins wrote a memoir of his youth, entitled Hate: My Life in the British Far Right which included a foreword by Billy Bragg.

Hope Not Hate 
Matthew Collins is currently a researcher and Head of Intelligence for the anti-fascist and anti-racist campaign group Hope Not Hate. Hope Not Hate is described as a non-sectarian, nonpartisan third party organisation. He manages Hope Not Hate's intelligence network.

Collins managed Robbie Mullen, a mole in National Action, in foiling a plot to murder Labour MP Rosie Cooper in 2017. In 2019, Matthew Collins wrote his second book, Nazi Terrorist: The Story of National Action with Robbie Mullen, and in 2022, he wrote his third book, The Walk-In: Fascists, Spies & Lies - The True Story Behind the ITV series, with a foreword by political journalist Kevin Maguire associate editor of the Daily Mirror newspaper.

Collins is played by the actor Stephen Graham in the ITV television drama series The Walk-In broadcast in Autumn 2022. He appeared in the documentary Nazi Hunters: The Real Walk-In which was broadcast after the final episode.

References

External links 

Matthew Collins' Twitter page
Hope Not Hate website
Matthew Collins' Nazi Terrorist book website
Matthew Collins' The Walk-In: Fascists, Spies & Lies book website
Matthew Collins interviewed with Robbie Mullins on the JOE UK channel
Matthew Collins interviewed by Rosie Boycott on the Life etc BBC programme

English fascists
1972 births
Living people
21st-century English memoirists
Writers from London
National Front (UK) politicians
British National Party people
English neo-Nazis
English anti-fascists
English expatriates in Australia
British anti-racism activists